The Progressive Liberal Party was a political party in Guatemala. It had a nationalistic and liberal ideology. It was founded in 1922, and dissolved in 1944.

The party, led by Jorge Ubico won the 1931 general election unopposed.

Electoral history

Presidential elections

Legislative Assembly elections

Presidents of Guatemala

References

External links
Topic

1926 establishments in Guatemala
1944 disestablishments in Guatemala
Defunct political parties in Guatemala
Nationalist parties in Guatemala
Parties of one-party systems
Political parties disestablished in 1944
Political parties established in 1926